The North East Zone women's cricket team is a women's cricket team that represents north east India in the Women's Senior Inter Zonal One Day and Senior Women's Inter Zonal T20. It is a composite team of players from six teams from north east India: Arunachal Pradesh, Manipur, Meghalaya, Mizoram, Nagaland and Sikkim. They were formed in 2022 to compete in the inaugural Women's Inter Zonal T20 competition.

History
Before the 2022–23 season, inter zonal cricket in India had consisted of five teams, representing the Central, East, North, South and West zones. With the addition of Arunachal Pradesh, Manipur, Meghalaya, Mizoram, Nagaland and Sikkim to the BCCI ahead of the 2018–19 season, a new zone was required when zonal cricket returned in 2022–23. Therefore, the North East Zone cricket team was created in both men's and women's cricket. The North East Zone women's cricket team first competed at the inaugural inter zonal T20 competition, the 2022–23 Women's Senior Inter Zonal T20. They finished sixth in the tournament, losing all of their matches. In February 2023, the 2022–23 Women's Senior Inter Zonal One Day tournament took place, in which they again finished sixth, losing all of their matches.

Players

Current squad
Based on squad announced for the 2022–23 season.

Seasons

Women's Senior Inter Zonal T20

Women's Senior Inter Zonal One Day

References

Women's cricket teams in India